Nazim Alidjanov (born 26 July 1970) is a Moldovan wrestler. He competed in the men's freestyle 57 kg at the 1996 Summer Olympics.

References

External links
 

1970 births
Living people
Moldovan male sport wrestlers
Olympic wrestlers of Moldova
Wrestlers at the 1996 Summer Olympics
Place of birth missing (living people)
20th-century Moldovan people